Benteen Park is a neighborhood in southeast Atlanta, Georgia, bounded on the west by Boulevard and the Chosewood Park neighborhood, on the north by Boulevard Heights, on the east by Custer/McDonough/Gulce and on the south by Atlanta Federal Prison, which also lies in the Benteen Park neighborhood.

The neighborhood experienced gentrification during the first decade of the 2000s, with low housing prices yet proximity to facilities in Grant Park.

See also

References

External links
 SAND, South Atlantans for Neighborhood Development

Neighborhoods in Atlanta